Endogenous Bornavirus-like nucleoprotein 1 is a protein that in humans is encoded by the EBLN1 gene.

References

Further reading